T-Town may refer to:

United States 
T-Town Velodrome, the Lehigh Valley Velodrome, Pennsylvania
Tampa, Florida
Tacoma, Washington
Tallahassee, Florida
Teutopolis, Illinois
Texarkana, Texas
Texarkana, Arkansas 
Tierrasanta, a community in San Diego, California
Tinsel town, a nickname for Hollywood, Los Angeles, California
Toledo, Ohio
Trenton, New Jersey
Tucson, Arizona
Tullahoma, Tennessee
Tulsa, Oklahoma
Tupelo, Mississippi
Turlock, California
Tuscaloosa, Alabama
Tooele, Utah
Torrance, California
Thomaston, Georgia
Tucker, Georgia
Tazewell, Tennessee

México 
Torreón, Coahuila

Norway 
Tønsberg
Trondheim
Tromsø
Tananger